Phthia was a region in ancient Greece; the home of the mythical Myrmidons 

It can also refer to:
In Greek mythology: see Phthia (mythology)
Phthia, one of the Niobids
Phthia, mother of Dorus, Laodocus and Polypoetes by Apollo
Phthia or Clytia, concubine of Amyntor
Phthia, daughter of Phoroneus
In ancient history:
Phthia of Epirus, the mother of Pyrrhus of Epirus
Phthia of Macedon, a granddaughter of Pyrrhus of Epirus
Other:
189 Phthia, an asteroid
Phthia (bug), a genus of leaf-footed bug